3rd Eye Vision is the first studio album by American hip hop collective Hieroglyphics. It was released by Hieroglyphics Imperium Recordings on March 24, 1998. It peaked at number 26 on the Billboard Heatseekers Albums chart, as well as number 88 on the Top R&B/Hip-Hop Albums chart. It has sold more than 100,000 copies.

Critical reception
In 2015, Fact placed the album at number 34 on the "100 Best Indie Hip-Hop Records of All Time" list.

Track listing

Personnel
Credits adapted from liner notes.

 Domino – production (1, 3, 8, 10, 15, 16, 17, 19, 20)
 A-Plus – production (2, 12)
 Del the Funky Homosapien – production (4, 5)
 Casual – production (6, 9)
 Phesto – production (7)
 Opio – production (11, 13, 18)
 Jeff Cleland – bass guitar (11)
 Robski – turntables (11)
 J-Biz – production (14, 22), turntables (21, 22)
 Toure – production (21)
 Matt Kelley – engineering
 Ken Lee – editing
 Brian Gardner – mastering
 Stephan Chandler – artwork, layout
 Jake Rosenberg – photography

Charts

References

External links
 

1998 debut albums
Hieroglyphics (group) albums
Hieroglyphics Imperium Recordings albums